Uttung Hitendra Thakur is National Award winner Indian Film Producer. Thakur made his debut as a film producer with the Marathi film Balak Palak on the topic of sex education, Co-produced by Actor Riteish Deshmukh and directed by Ravi Jadhav. He also remade Balak Palak in Malayalam as Swarna Malsyangal Balak Palak created a world record through ‘UFO Moviez’ and Valuable Edutainment as India’s first multi locational interactive Live Premiere of Marathi film on 3 January 2013.

Thakur produced a Marathi film Yellow directed by Mahesh Limaye and co-produced by Riteish Deshmukh and the story explores a mother/daughter relationship involving developmental disability and childlike behaviour. Thakur's Yellow also won the Special Jury Award, while the child actors Gauri Gadgil and Sanjana Rai received Special Mention at 61st National Film Awards.

Thakur produced a Marathi film named Dokyala Shot in 2019, directed by debutant Shivkumar Parthasarathy. Singer Mika Singh made Marathi debut with "Dokyala Shot". Also actor Prajakta Mali and Suvrat Joshi made their debut as singers in Dokyala Shot.

Filmography

Awards and nominations

References

External links

People from Maharashtra
Living people
Marathi film producers
Film producers from Mumbai
Film producers from Maharashtra
Year of birth missing (living people)